A stinger is an organ or body part found in various animals, typically arthropods, that usually delivers some kind of venom

Stinger may also refer to:

Military and transport
 A type of military camouflage with a primarily yellow base
 A brand of radar detector/LIDAR detector
 Operation Stinger, a military operation during the Croatian War of Independence

Aircraft
 The AC-119K version of Fairchild AC-119 gunship was nicknamed Stinger
Preceptor Stinger, an American single-seat parasol-wing ultralight design
Rans S-17 Stinger, an American single-seat ultralight design
Rans S-18 Stinger II, an American two-seat ultralight design
Williams W-17 Stinger, an American racing aircraft design

Automobiles
 Pacer Stinger, a 1976 show car by American Motors
 Stinger (law enforcement), a bait car system developed by BSM Wireless
 Police slang for a spike strip, a device used in pursuits to deflate vehicle tires
 Kia Stinger, a sport sedan.

Ships
 , a United States Navy patrol boat in commission from 1917 to 1919
 Stinger, an extension over board the stern of an offshore pipe lay barge used to provide additional support at the over bend of an S-lay during offshore construction

Weapons
 AIM-92 Stinger, an air-to-air missile
 FIM-92 Stinger, a surface-to-air missile
 M2 Stinger, a USMC field modification of the .30 AN/M2 Browning machine gun variant
 Stinger grenade or sting grenade, a type of hand grenade
 Stinger round, a type of specialty ammunition for shotguns
 Stinger, a series of airsoft guns manufactured by Crosman

Sports
Salt Lake Stingers, former name of the Salt Lake Bees Minor League Baseball team
 "Stinger", a nickname for American professional wrestler Steve Borden aka Sting
 Stinger, is a mascot name for teams such as the Columbus Blue Jackets and Baldwin Wallace University

Entertainment
 Stinger (comics), any of several comic book characters named Stinger
 Stinger, a 1988 science fiction horror novel by Robert R. McCammon
 Stingers (TV series) (1998–2004)   Australian police drama television series
 Stinger (radio), a short sound clip used to divide sections of a radio program or podcast, also known as a sounder
 Stinger (filmmaking), film industry slang for a post-credits scene
 Stinger (arcade game), a 1983 arcade shoot 'em up by Seibu Denshi
 Moero TwinBee: Cinnamon-hakase o Sukue!, a 1986 Family Computer game that was released in 1987 for the Nintendo Entertainment System under the title of Stinger
 Stinger (Dorney Park), a defunct roller coaster in Allentown, Pennsylvania, US
 Stinger, used at the end of some American march music
 Stinger Guitars, made by C. F. Martin & Company
 The Stinger (album)

Other
 Stinger (cocktail), a drink composed of brandy and white creme de menthe
 Stinger (sculpture), an outdoor work by Tony Smith in Seattle, Washington, US
 Stinger (medicine), a minor neurological injury suffered by athletes
 Stinger, the conductor with higher voltage to neutral than the other two conductors in a high-leg delta three-phase electric power system

See also
 Sting (disambiguation)
 Stung (disambiguation)